"Keep It on a Low" is a song by English rapper/producer Dot Rotten. The song was first released on 4 November 2011 in the United Kingdom as the lead single from the rapper's debut studio album, Voices in My Head. NME praised the track, describing it as "uplifting, grime-derived pop music in hi-def".

Track listing

Live performances
As part of the Radio 1/1Xtra Hull takeover, Rotten performed the tracks "Keep It on a Low" and "Are You Not Entertained" on 28 January – joining DJ Trevor Nelson at Hull University.

Release history

References

2011 singles
Dot Rotten songs
2011 songs
Mercury Records singles
Song recordings produced by TMS (production team)
Songs written by Peter Kelleher (songwriter)
Songs written by Tom Barnes (songwriter)
Songs written by Ben Kohn